Sisurcana cirrhochroma is a species of moth of the family Tortricidae. It is found in Napo Province, Ecuador.

The wingspan is about 28 mm. The ground colour of the forewings is yellow with sparse brown scales and some costal dots. The hindwings are pale brownish cream, spotted with brownish.

Etymology
The species name refers to the colouration of the forewing and is derived from Greek cirrhos (meaning yellow) and chroma (meaning colour).

References

Moths described in 2010
Sisurcana
Moths of South America
Taxa named by Józef Razowski